The Crown Prince Cup is a Kuwaiti domestic annual football competition created in 1994.

Previous winners
1994 : Kuwait SC
1995 : Kazma SC
1996 : Al Arabi SC
1997 : Al Arabi SC
1998 : Qadsia SC
1999 : Al Arabi SC
2000 : Al Arabi SC
2001 : Al-Salmiya SC
2002 : Qadsia SC
2003 : Kuwait SC 3–0 Al Arabi SC
2004 : Qadsia SC 2–1 Kuwait SC
2005 : Qadsia SC 1–1 Kuwait SC   (3–1 pen)
2006 : Qadsia SC 2–2 Kuwait SC   (3–2 pen)
2007 : Al Arabi SC 1–0 Kazma SC
2008 : Kuwait SC 1–0 AET Qadsia SC
2009 : Al Qadisiya Kuwait 1–1 Kuwait SC   (5–3 pen)
2010 : Kuwait SC 2–2 (3–2 pens) Al Arabi SC
2011 : Kuwait SC 2–1  Khaitan SC
2012 : Al Arabi SC 0–0 (4–1 pens) Qadsia SC
2013 : Qadsia SC 3–1 Al Arabi SC
2014 : Qadsia SC 2–1 Al Arabi SC
2014–15 :  Al-Arabi SC 4–2 Kuwait SC (a.e.t)
2015–16 : Al-Salmiya SC 1–0 Kuwait SC
2016–17: Kuwait SC 0–0 (5–3 pens.) Qadsia SC
2017–18: Qadsia SC 1–1 (6–5 pens.) Kuwait SC
2018–19 : Kuwait SC 1–0 Qadsia SC
2019–20 : Kuwait SC 0–0 (3–2 pens) Al Arabi SC
2020–21 : Kuwait SC 2–1  Qadsia SC
2021–22 : Al Arabi SC 1–1 (5–4 pens) Kuwait SC
2022–23 : Al Arabi SC 2–2 (4–1 pens) Al-Salmiya SC

Performance by club

External links
 goalzz.com – Kuwaiti Crown Prince Cup
 Kuwait – List of Cup Winners, RSSSF.com
 Kuwaiti Crown Prince Cup – Hailoosport.com (Arabic)
 Kuwaiti Crown Prince Cup – Hailoosport.com

 
2
Recurring sporting events established in 1994
1994 establishments in Kuwait